Qannuyak formerly Kanuyak Island is a member of the Barry Islands within the Arctic Archipelago in the Kitikmeot Region, Nunavut. It is located in Bathurst Inlet. Other islands in the vicinity include Igluhugyuk, Iqalulialuk, Algaq, Shoe Island, and Aupilaktuq.

References 

Islands of Bathurst Inlet
Uninhabited islands of Kitikmeot Region